This is a list of institutions and other entities in Kenya named after former president Daniel arap Moi (1924–2020).

Airports 

Moi Air Base, Nairobi
Moi International Airport, Mombasa

Hospitals 
Moi Teaching and Referral Hospital

Sports 
Moi International Sports Centre, Kasarani, Nairobi
Moi Stadium, Kisumu
Nyayo National Stadium, Nairobi

Roads and streets 
Moi Avenue, Mombasa
Moi Avenue, Nairobi
Moi Road, Githunguri

Education 
Moi University, Eldoret
Moi High School-Mbiruri, Embu
Moi High School Kabarak, Nakuru
Moi Girls Eldoret
Moi Forces Academy, Nairobi
Moi Forces Academy, Lanet
Moi Forces Academy, Mombasa 
Moi High School, Kaplamai
Moi Sirgoi High School, Mosoriot
Moi Girls' High School, Nangili
Moi Girls' High School, Kapsabet
Moi Girls, Kibwezi
Moi Girls, Kamangu
Moi High School-kasighau, Taita Taveta
Moi Equator Girls Secondary School, Nanyuki
Moi Siongiroi Girls High School, Bomet
Moi Girls High School, Marsabit.
Arap Moi Primary School, Nkoroi, Kajiado County
Moi Girls High School, Kamusinga
Moi Girls Vokoli, Wodonga- Vihiga

Other
Moi Barracks, Eldoret

Moi, Daniel arap